Niccolò Lapi (Florence, c. 1667–1732) was an Italian painter of the Baroque period, active mainly in Tuscany.

He is described as a follower of Giordano,

He painted for the church of San Jacopo Soprarno, the church of Santa Maria dei Candeli, and the church of San Michele Visdomini. In Vallombrosa there are paintings, and at Figline Valdarno, there is a Martyrdom of the Blessed Tesauro Beccaria. He was patronized by the Prince Ferdinando de' Medici. Among his colleagues were Anton Domenico Gabbiani and Francesco Conti.

Sources
 Dizionario biografico degli italiani LXIII, Roma, Istituto dell'Enciclopedia Italiana, 2004

18th-century Italian painters
Italian male painters
Painters from Florence
Italian Baroque painters
Year of birth unknown
1732 deaths
Year of birth uncertain
18th-century Italian male artists